Miss International 1969, the 9th Miss International pageant, was held on September 13, 1969 at the Nippon Budokan in Tokyo, Japan for the second time. 48 contestants competed for the pageant. Finally, Valerie Holmes from Great Britain was crowned as Miss International 1969 by outgoing titleholder, Maria Carvalho from Brazil.

Results

Placements

Contestants

  - Graciela Eva Arévalo
  - Janine Forbes
  - Crystl Holler
  - Josyjane Minet
  - Erika Kohlenberger
  - Maria Lúcia Alexandrino dos Santos
  - Valerie Susan Holmes
  - Nancy Wilson
  - Shirline Clara Perera
  - Laura Fabiola Pimiento Barrera
  - Sonia Kohkemper
  - Gitte Broge
  - Alexandra Swanberg
  - Satu Charlotta Östring
  - Sophie Yallant
  - Brigitta Komorowski
  - Rea Nikolaou
  - Mercedes Rosario Rubic
  - Els van der Kolk
  - Cecile McSmith
  - Helen Knutsdóttir
  - Wendy Leslie Vaz
  - Irma Hardisurya
  - Mary Kelly
  - Sara Dvir
  - Juliana Lamberti
  - Audrey Dell
  - Akemi Okemoto
  - Kim Yoo-kyoung
  - Mireille Colling
  - Pauline Chai Siew Phin
  - Rose Barpy
  - Ana Maria Magaña
  - Rahima Hachti
  - Deirdre Bruton
  - Maria Margarita Cuadra Lacayo
  - Ingeborg Marie Sorensen
  - Margaret Rose "Binky" Orbe Montinola
  - Maria Isabela Rosa Pinho
  - Mery de Lara Caballero
  - Jenny Serwan Wong
  - Bodil Jensen
  - Jeanette Biffiger
  - Dominique Viloria Poemoana
  - Usanee Phenphimol
  - Rekaia Dekhil
  - Gayle Kovaly
  - Cristina Keusch Pérez

References

External links
Pageantopolis - Miss International 1969

1969
1969 beauty pageants
Beauty pageants in Japan
1969 in Tokyo
September 1969 events in Asia